Mere Harjai is a Pakistani television series aired on ARY Digital during 2013. It is produced by Abdullah Seja under Idream Entertainment. It focuses on the love triangle and starring Mawra Hocane, Sonya Hussain and Sami Khan in lead.

Plot
Two sisters, one of which is extremely kind and patient where as the other one is selfish and jealous, fight for their respective choices in life.

Cast
 Mawra Hocane as Maha
 Sonya Hussain as Maheen
 Hassan Ahmed as Saad
 Sami Khan as Moeed
 Nargis Rasheed as Rohan
 Tahira Imam as Faiza
 Anwar Iqbal
 Minahil
 Anam Malik

References

External links
 

2013 Pakistani television series debuts
Pakistani drama television series
Urdu-language television shows